Bethel University may refer to:

Bethel University (Indiana)
Bethel University (Minnesota)
Bethel University (Tennessee)
Bethel University  (Zambia)
Former name of Shorter College (Arkansas)